Eliana Jones (born October 28, 1997) is a Canadian actress. She first came to attention as the younger version of the Alex character on Nikita (2010–2012), and in the recurring role of Alexa Sworn, one of the twin daughters of the sheriff, in the television series Hemlock Grove (2013).

Career
Jones wanted to become an actress when her mom took her to an acting class. After the class, Jones thought it was very enjoyable. As a result, Jones quit gymnastics, which she had been doing for six years and started taking acting classes. Jones played the recurring role of Young Alex, appearing in nine episodes of Nikita. She has said that she decided she wanted to commit to professional acting after her time on Nikita. In 2018, Jones co-starred as Lara in the psychological thriller film, Nomis, also known as Night Hunter. In 2019, Jones portrayed Gwen in the Canadian drama television series, Northern Rescue. In 2021, she was cast in a role in the American biographical drama Lamborghini: The Man Behind the Legend.

Filmography

References

External links

1997 births
21st-century Canadian actresses
Living people
Actresses from Toronto
Canadian child actresses
Canadian television actresses
Canadian gymnasts